Hasnul Zaim bin Zafri (born 17 August 2002) is a Malaysian footballer who plays as a centre-back for Malaysia Super League club Perak FC.

Club career

Sri Pahang
Hasnul was graduated from Sri Pahang U21 team.

Hasnul made his Malaysia Super League debut for the club on 5 January 2021.

References

External links
 

1999 births
Living people
Sri Pahang FC players
Perak F.C. players
Malaysian footballers
Malaysian people of Malay descent
Malaysia Super League players
Association football defenders